Wenzong is the temple name of several Chinese monarchs. It may refer to:
 Emperor Wenzong of Tang (809-840), who reigned over Tang China between 826 and 840
 Jayaatu Khan, Emperor Wenzong of Yuan (1304-1332), who reigned over the Yuan Dynasty between 1328 and 1329 and again between 1329 and 1332
 Xianfeng Emperor (1831-1861), born Yizhu, of the Qing Dynasty, who served between 1850 and 1861

See also 
 Munjong (disambiguation) (Korean romanization)

Temple name disambiguation pages